Battlegrounds Mobile India (BGMI, previously known as PUBG Mobile India) is the Indian version of PUBG Mobile, exclusively for players in India. It is an online multiplayer battle royale game developed and published by Krafton. The game released on 2 July 2021 for Android devices, and on 18 August 2021 for iOS devices. On 28 July 2022 BGMI was removed from the Play Store in Android and App Store in iOS following orders from the Indian government.

As of July 2022, BGMI surpassed 100 million downloads on Google Play store.

Gameplay 
Battlegrounds Mobile India, or BGMI, is a player-versus-player shooter game in which up to 100 players compete in a battle royale, a type of large-scale last man standing deathmatch in which players compete to be the last one standing. Players can enter the match as individuals or as small groups of up to four.

Each match starts with players parachuting from a plane onto one of the following six maps:
Erangel (Themed / Normal)
Miramar
Vikendi
Livik (Themed / Normal)
Karakin
Sanhok ( Themed / Normal)

Each round, the plane's flight path across the map changes, requiring players to quickly determine the best time to eject and parachute to the ground. Players begin with no equipment other than customised clothing options that have no effect on gameplay. Once on the ground, players can search buildings, ghost towns, and other locations for weapons, vehicles, armour, and other items. At the start of a match, these items are procedurally distributed throughout the map, with higher-risk zones typically having better equipment. Finished players can also be looted for their gear. Players can choose to play in first-person or third-person, with each having advantages and disadvantages in combat and situational awareness.

Every few minutes, the map's playable area shrinks towards a random location, with any player caught outside the safe zone taking incremental damage and eventually being eliminated if the safe zone is not entered in time; in game, the boundary appears as a shimmering blue wall that contracts over time. This results in a more constrained map, which increases the likelihood of encounters. Random regions of the map are highlighted in red and bombed during the match, posing a threat to players who remain in that area. Players are warned a few minutes before these events in both cases, giving them time to relocate to safety. A plane will occasionally fly over different parts of the playable map at random, or wherever a player uses a flare gun, and drop a loot package containing items that are normally unobtainable during normal gameplay. These packages emit highly visible red or yellow smoke, attracting interested players and resulting in additional confrontations. A full round takes about 30 minutes on average.

Development 
On 2 September 2020, the Ministry of Electronics and Information Technology of the Government of India banned PUBG Mobile, along with 117 Chinese applications, citing activities that were prejudicial and a threat to India's sovereignty, integrity, and defence, state security, and public order under Section 69A of the Information Technology Act, 2000.

It was reported in November 2020 that PUBG Mobile would be relaunched in India under the name PUBG Mobile India. On 24 November 2020, The Times of India reported that PUBG Studios and South Korea's video game company Krafton had registered PUBG India Private Limited under the Ministry of Corporate Affairs, Government of India in order to relaunch PUBG Mobile in India.

It was reported in May 2021 that PUBG Mobile would be rebranded as Battlegrounds Mobile India in order to enter the Indian gaming market. Following that, The Indian Express reported on 7 May 2021 that Krafton confirmed in a press statement that they were going to launch Battlegrounds Mobile India, a game similar to PUBG Mobile.

Release 
The game was announced on 6 May 2021 at night. The pre-registrations of the game started for Android users on 18 May 2021 and early access beta version of the game was released on 17 June 2021 only for Android users. The game released on 2 July 2021 for Android devices, and on 18 August 2021 for iOS devices.

On 21 June 2021, following the early beta release for Android users, IGN India first reported that data from users' Android devices was being sent to Tencent-owned China servers. "One reason for this could be because Krafton is allowing BGMI players to transfer their account and game data from PUBG Mobile to BGMI until December 2021," according to The Times of India. Following this data sharing violation, Krafton, the developer of BGMI, issued a brief in-game update on 22 June 2021 to resolve the data sharing issue with China-based servers. However, it has been reported that if a user deletes the application data, the game may ping Chinese servers.

Ban in India 
On 28 July 2022, the game was removed from Google Play and App Store following a government order but game is working without any VPN.

References

External links 
 

2021 video games
Android (operating system) games
IOS games
Battle royale games
Mobile games
Indian games
Esports games
Multiplayer video games
Survival video games
Unreal Engine games
Video games set in India
Internet censorship in India